Hollingsworth Park may refer to:

 Hollingsworth Park (Lakeland, Florida), park located at Lake Hollingsworth
 Hollingsworth Park (Macon, Georgia)
 Hollingsworth Park (Braintree, Massachusetts), park and baseball complex
 Hollingsworth Park (Elkton, Maryland)